was a Japanese daimyō who lived in the Sengoku through early Edo periods. He was the tenth head of the Imagawa clan, and was a son of Imagawa Yoshimoto and the father of Imagawa Norimochi and Shinagawa Takahisa.

Biography
Ujizane was born in Sunpu Domain; he was the eldest son of Imagawa Yoshimoto. In 1554, he married the daughter of Hōjō Ujiyasu (Lady Hayakawa) as part of the Kai-Sagami-Suruga Alliance. Ujizane inherited family headship in 1558, when his father retired in order to focus his attention on the Imagawa advance into Tōtōmi and Mikawa Provinces. His childhood name was Tatsuomaru (龍王丸).

In 1560, Yoshimoto was killed in the Battle of Okehazama, the province of Totomi and Mikawa went into chaos. Ujizane succeeded his father, but due to the chaotic state of the Imagawa clan, many vassals betray Ujizane. His grandmother, Jukei-ni, who exercised great political power, died in 1568. Motivated by this, Takeda Shingen and Tokugawa Ieyasu attacked the lands of Imagawa.

In 1568, Shingen began his invasion into Suruga, the Imagawa army faced a debacle and Sunpu Castle was quickly occupied. Later, Ujizane fled to Kakegawa Castle in Totomi Province.

After his defeat in the 1569 Siege of Kakegawa, Imagawa Ujizane allied himself with Ieyasu in return for help in recovering his territory in Suruga Province.

Ujizane later retaliated against the landlocked Takeda clan with a salt embargo. This had little effect because Uesugi Kenshin took the opportunity to sell salt to the Takeda, and only resulted in the downfall of the Imagawa clan.

It is recorded in "Shincho Koki" (Account of Nobunaga) that on 1575, he had a conference with Oda Nobunaga and Tokugawa Ieyasu, at Sokoku-ji Temple. Also, he joined the army in the Battle of Nagashino.

The Imagawa family was summoned by Tokugawa Ieyasu and made Tokugawa retainers, with the rank of kōke. 
Ujizane enjoyed playing Kemari and poetry. He died at the family estate in Shinagawa in 1615.

Family
Father: Imagawa Yoshimoto (1519–1560)
Mother: Jōkei-in (1519-1550)
Wife: Lady Hayakawa
Concubine: Ihara Tadayasu’s daughter
Children:
 Daughter married Kira Yoshisada by Lady Hayakawa
Imagawa Norimochi (1570-1608) by Lady Hayakawa
Shinagawa Takahisa by Lady Hayakawa
 Nishio Yasunobu by Lady Hayakawa
 son (澄存) by Lady Hayakawa

References

1538 births
1615 deaths
Imagawa clan
Daimyo